Maharathi may refer to:

 Maharathi (warrior)
 Maharathi (2007 film), Indian Telugu Language Film
 Maharathi (2008 film), Indian Hindi Language Film

See also
Maharathi Karna